Christophe Avezac (born March 12, 1977, in Saint-Gaudens, France) is a French former midfielder currently coaching for Comminges Saint-Gaudens Foot.

Career
Avezac previously played for Toulouse FC and FC Metz in Ligue 1 and Dijon FCO and AC Ajaccio in Ligue 2.

References

1977 births
Living people
French footballers
Toulouse FC players
FC Metz players
Dijon FCO players
AC Ajaccio players
Vannes OC players
Pau FC players
Association football midfielders